The 2016 FFA Cup was the third season of the FFA Cup, the main national soccer knockout cup competition in Australia. 32 teams again took part in the competition proper (from the round of 32), including the 10 A-League teams and 21 Football Federation Australia (FFA) member federation teams determined through individual state qualifying rounds, as well as the reigning National Premier Leagues Champion (Blacktown City from NSW).

The winner of the FFA Cup, Melbourne City, received $50,000 as part of a total prize money pool of $131,000. The defending champions, Melbourne Victory, were knocked out in the semi-final stage of the competition.

Round and dates

Prize fund
The prize fund was unchanged from the 2015 event.

In addition, a further $2,500 was donated from sponsor NAB to Member Federation clubs for each goal scored by them against an A-League opposition. Clubs to receive donations were: Green Gully ($5,000), Redlands United ($5,000), Brisbane Strikers ($2,500), Edgeworth FC ($2,500) and Floreat Athena ($2,500).

Preliminary rounds

FFA member federations teams competed in various state-based preliminary rounds to win one of 21 places in the competition proper (round of 32). All Australian clubs were eligible to enter the qualifying process through their respective FFA member federation, however only one team per club was permitted entry in the competition. All nine FFA member federations participated.  The number of qualification spots per member federation was unchanged from the 2015 tournament.

The preliminary rounds operated within a consistent national structure whereby club entry into the competition is staggered in each state/territory, ultimately leading to round 7 with the winning clubs from that round gaining direct entry into the round of 32. The first matches of the preliminary rounds began in February 2016, and the final matches of the preliminary rounds in June 2016.

Teams 
A total of 32 teams participated in the 2016 FFA Cup competition proper, ten of which came from the A-League, one the 2015 National Premier Leagues Champion (Blacktown City), and the remaining 21 teams from FFA member federations, as determined by the qualifying rounds. A-League clubs represent the highest level in the Australian league system, whereas member federation clubs come from Level 2 and below. The current season tier of member federation clubs is shown in parentheses.

Bracket

Round of 32
The Round of 32 draw took place on 30 June 2016, with match information confirmed on 5 July.

The lowest ranked sides that qualified for this round were Marconi Stallions and Surfers Paradise Apollo. They were the only level 3 teams left in the competition.

All times listed below are at AEST

Round of 16
The Round of 16 draw took place on 10 August 2016, immediately following matchday 4 of the round of 32, with match information confirmed on 12 August.

The lowest ranked sides that qualified for this round were Bentleigh Greens, Blacktown City, Bonnyrigg White Eagles, Brisbane Strikers, Canberra Olympic, Devonport City, Edgeworth FC, Green Gully, Hume City, Melbourne Knights and Redlands United. They were the only level 2 teams left in the competition.

All times listed below are at AEST

Quarter-finals
The quarter-finals draw took place on 30 August 2016, immediately following the final matchday of the round of 16, with match information confirmed on 2 September.

The lowest ranked sides that qualified for this round were Bentleigh Greens, Blacktown City, Canberra Olympic and Green Gully. They were the only level 2 teams left in the competition.

All times listed below are at AEST

Semi-finals
The semi-finals draw took place on 27 September 2016, immediately following the final matchday of the quarter-finals, with the match details announced on 29 September.

The lowest ranked side that qualified for this round was Canberra Olympic, who were the only level 2 team left in the competition.

All times listed below are at AEDT

Final
All times listed below are at AEDT

Top goalscorers

Broadcasting rights
The live television rights for the competition were held by the subscription network Fox Sports, who broadcast 11 games live, with live updates and crosses from a single camera at the concurrent matches for goals and highlights. Games not broadcast on Fox Sports were streamed live via their online services.  These matches were televised live by Fox Sports:

References

External links
 Official website

FFA Cup
2016 in Australian soccer
Australia Cup seasons